Happy Christmas is a 2014 American comedy-drama film written, produced and directed by Joe Swanberg. It stars Swanberg, Anna Kendrick, Melanie Lynskey, Mark Webber, and Lena Dunham. Like most of Swanberg's previous features, the film's dialogue was entirely improvised.

The film had its world premiere at the 2014 Sundance Film Festival (where it was nominated for the Grand Jury Prize in the U.S. Dramatic Competition) on January 19, 2014.

It was released on June 26, 2014, through video on demand prior to being released in a limited release July 25, 2014 in the United States by Magnolia Pictures.

Plot
Irresponsible 20-something Jenny (Anna Kendrick) arrives in Chicago to live with her older brother Jeff (Joe Swanberg), a young filmmaker living a happy existence with his novelist wife Kelly (Melanie Lynskey) and their two-year-old son. Jenny's arrival shakes up their quiet domesticity as she and Jenny's friend from high school Carson (Lena Dunham) instigate an evolution in Kelly's life and career.

Cast
Anna Kendrick as Jenny
Melanie Lynskey as Kelly
Joe Swanberg as Jeff
Mark Webber as Kevin
Lena Dunham as Carson

Release
Magnolia Pictures and Paramount Pictures jointly acquired the international distribution rights prior to the film's premiere screening. The film had its world premiere at the Sundance Film Festival on January 19, 2014. The film was released on video on demand on June 26, 2014, before being released in a limited release on July 25, 2014.

Reception
The film has been met with positive reviews. The website's critics consensus reads: "Intelligent, well-acted, and satisfyingly low-key, Happy Christmas marks another step in prolific filmmaker Joe Swanberg's creative evolution." On Metacritic, the film has a score of 70 out of 100, based on 28 critics, indicating "generally favorable reviews."

See also
 List of Christmas films

References

External links
 
 
 
 
 

2014 films
2010s Christmas comedy-drama films
American Christmas comedy-drama films
American independent films
Films directed by Joe Swanberg
Films set in Chicago
Mumblecore films
2014 independent films
2010s English-language films
2010s American films